Chester Rogers (born January 12, 1994) is an American football wide receiver who is a free agent. He played college football at Grambling State and signed with the Indianapolis Colts as an undrafted free agent in 2016.

Acting career
Chester Rogers started acting when he was 10 years old with the stage name of Tre Rogers. His first movie, Constellation was filmed in his hometown of Huntsville, Alabama, where he played a younger version of the character played by actor Billy Dee Williams. Afterwards, Chester and his mom decided to pursue acting, and move out to California for four years. During that time, he also was in Madea's Family Reunion, Re-Animated on Cartoon Network, and Dirty with Cuba Gooding Jr. He was also originally cast in both Everybody Hates Chris and House of Payne, before the parts were recast after changes were made to the shows. He then put acting on hold to go to Grambling State to pursue football.

College career
Rogers attended and played college football at Grambling State from 2012–2015.

Collegiate statistics

Professional career

Indianapolis Colts
Rogers was signed by the Indianapolis Colts as an undrafted free agent on May 2, 2016. He finished the 2016 season with 19 catches for 273 yards while playing in 14 games for the Colts.

On November 12, 2017, during Week 10 against the Pittsburgh Steelers, Rogers posted his first career game with over 100 yards of receiving, finishing with 104 receiving yards on sixt receptions and a touchdown, but the Colts lost the game 20–17. Overall, in the 2017 season, he finished with 23 receptions for 284 receiving yards and one receiving touchdown.

Going into the 2018 season, Rogers remained in the rotation for the Colts. In Week 6, against the New York Jets, he scored his first receiving touchdown of the season. In Week 16, Rogers caught the go-ahead score with 55 seconds remaining to beat the New York Giants 28-27. He finished the season playing in all 16 games with 10 starts, recording 53 receptions for 485 yards and two touchdowns.

Entering 2019, Rogers was named the fourth wide receiver on the depth chart. He suffered a knee fracture in Week 13 and was placed on injured reserve on December 2, 2019. He finished the season with 16 catches for 179 yards and two touchdowns through 12 games and six starts. He became a free agent following the season.

Miami Dolphins
On August 9, 2020, Rogers signed a one-year contract with the Miami Dolphins. He was released on September 2, 2020.

Tennessee Titans
On September 21, 2020, Rogers was signed to the Tennessee Titans practice squad. He was signed to a futures contract on January 11, 2021. 

Rogers made his first appearance with the Titans in Week 1 of the 2021 season. On the year, he finished with 30 receptions for 301 yards and a touchdown while carving a role as a kick and punt returner.

Houston Texans
On August 2, 2022, Rogers signed with the Houston Texans. He was placed on injured reserve on August 21, 2022. He was released on August 29.

Cleveland Browns
On September 13, 2022, Rogers signed with the practice squad of the Cleveland Browns. He was released on November 28.

Career statistics

References

External links
Tennessee Titans bio
Grambling State Tigers bio

1994 births
Living people
Actors from Huntsville, Alabama
Cleveland Browns players
Grambling State Tigers football players
Houston Texans players
Indianapolis Colts players
Male actors from Alabama
Miami Dolphins players
Players of American football from Alabama
Sportspeople from Huntsville, Alabama
Tennessee Titans players